Carbis Bay (Cornish: Karrbons, meaning "causeway") is a seaside resort and village in Cornwall, England. The South West Coast Path passes above the beach.

Geography
Carbis Bay is almost contiguous with the town of St Ives and is in St Ives civil parish (part of the area served by St Ives Town Council), which encompasses St Ives, Carbis Bay, Lelant and Halsetown. The 2001 census gave the combined population of Carbis Bay and Lelant as 3,482. Lelant, an older settlement which is one mile to the south-east, Carbis Bay and St Ives are linked by the A3074 road which joins the A30 at Rose-an-Grouse. Carbis Bay railway station, above the beach, is one of five railway stations on the St Ives Bay Line which joins the mainline at St Erth railway station, which is also at Rose-an-Grouse. St Erth station is the junction for the main line to London Paddington.

Carbis Bay overlooks the small bay of the same name (Cornish: Porth reb Tor, meaning "cove beside the eminence", part of St Ives Bay) which is bounded to the north by Porthminster Point and to the east by Hawk's Point and contains a popular family beach. Hawk's Point is within the Hayle Estuary and Carrack Gladden Site of Special Scientific Interest (SSSI) and in the Victorian era was known locally for its pleasure grounds. The garden had a tea house and grotto; it was a venue for Sunday School outings and Band of Hope galas. By 1880, the proprietor William Payne claimed in an advertisement that it was "the largest establishment of the kind in the West ...".

Mining
Wheal Providence mine in Carbis Bay is the type locality of the rare mineral Connellite.

Local facilities

Notable structures

The parish church, which is dedicated to St Anta and All Saints, contains a ring of ten bells. This was the largest peal in a Cornish parish church until St Keverne's bells was increased to ten in 2001. The Carbis Bay Hotel, on the seafront, was built in 1894 by Silvanus Trevail. Behind the village stands the Knill Monument, known locally as "The Steeple", a 50-foot (15 m) high monument to John Knill, a mayor of nearby St Ives during the 18th century.

Transport
Carbis Bay is connected to the national railway network using the St Erth to St Ives branch line. St Erth is on the Cornish mainline linking London Paddington to Penzance. Road coaches also operate to and from London and St Erth on the National Express (London / Penzance) service. Local buses to and from St Ives / St Erth / Hayle / Penzance / Helston and other areas run. Overnight travel services include the Night Riviera sleeper train that operates through St Erth en route to and from Paddington and Penzance. A night coach via London Heathrow (arriving 05.30am) and London Victoria (arriving 06.30am), calls at Carbis Bay and West Cornwall.

Shops
Shops include, but not limited to: Costcutter, Tesco, Carbis Bay Pharmacy, Katrina Zimmer hairdressers, barbers, animal vets and an optician's. These are all located on St Ives Road, the main road through Carbis Bay to St Ives.

There is a mobile post office that parks at the Carbis Bay Memorial Hall, on Tuesday and Thursday, 9.30am to 12.00 noon.

Schools
St Uny Primary School, a Church of England School voluntarily controlled by the Diocese of Truro, is situated in Carbis Bay.

G7 Summit
In June 2021, Carbis Bay hosted the 47th G7 summit.

References

External links

 St Ives Town Council 
 Visit St Ives Information Centre

Bays of Cornwall
Beaches of Penwith
Populated coastal places in Cornwall
St Ives, Cornwall
Villages in Cornwall